Sami Sharaf (20 April 1929 – 23 January 2023) was an Egyptian military officer who held various posts during the presidency of Gamal Abdel Nasser. His public roles ended in May 1971 when he was arrested and then imprisoned by the Egyptian authorities in the period of Anwar Sadat.

Early life and education
Sharaf was born in Heliopolis, Cairo on 20 April 1929. His father was a physician. He graduated from the Military Academy in February 1949. One of his teachers at the academy was Gamal Abdel Nasser.

Career and activities
Following his graduation Sharaf joined the army. In January 1953 he was arrested in the artillery crackdown and jailed. After he was freed, he began to work in the military intelligence unit.

Sharaf was the head of the Presidential Office. On 28 September 1961, he was named as the state minister for presidential affairs. He was a member of the Arab Socialist Union and was part of its secret unit, the Socialist Vanguard (Arabic: al-Tanzim al-Tali‘i), which was also called the Vanguard Organization. The unit was established in 1963 and was headed by Sharaf and Sharawi Gomaa. As of 1971 Sharaf was one of the Vanguard secretariat's ten members.

Sharaf served as the minister of state until 13 May 1971 when he resigned. Shortly after his resignation he was arrested due to his alleged involvement in a planned coup to overthrow Anwar Sadat. He was sentenced to death, but in December 1971 his sentence was reduced to life imprisonment. He was released from the prison on 15 May 1981. Sharaf was among the cofounders of the Arab Democratic Nasserist Party, but later he left it.

Sharaf was an anti-communist and supported the establishment of a capitalist state. However, he was considered to be a Soviet agent from 1955. Following his removal from office in 1971 Ashraf Marwan who was the son-in-law of Nasser and an intelligence officer working under Sharaf, was given the task of coordinating the intelligence affairs. Sharaf published a book on his memoirs, Sanawat wa ayam ma‘ Jamal ‘Abd al Nasir: Shahadat Sami Sharaf, in 2006.

Personal life and death
Sharaf was married and had four children. He died on 23 January 2023 at the age of 93.

References

External links

1929 births
2023 deaths
Government ministers of Egypt
Egyptian prisoners sentenced to death
Egyptian Military Academy alumni
Egyptian political party founders
Arab Socialist Union (Egypt) politicians
Egyptian anti-communists
People from Cairo Governorate
Egyptian spies
Egyptian military officers
Egyptian prisoners sentenced to life imprisonment
Politicians from Cairo